The 1932 Providence Friars football team was an American football team that represented Providence College during the 1932 college football season. Led by eighth-year head coach Archie Golembeski, the team compiled a 4–2–2 record and outscored opponents by a total of 110 to 44.

Schedule

References

Providence
Providence Friars football seasons
Providence Friars football